Strömsholm is a locality situated, in the vicinity of Herrskogen, in Hallstahammar Municipality, Västmanland County, Sweden with 664 inhabitants in 2010.

In Strömsholm is Strömsholm Palace, and from 1621 Strömsholm was a center of military horse training to supply the Swedish Army with horses. Since 1968 Strömsholm is home of civil horse training only. Strömsholm Canal starts in Strömsholm.

References

External links

Populated places in Västmanland County
Populated places in Hallstahammar Municipality